See This Movie is a 2004 comedy film written by David M. Rosenthal and Joseph Matthew Smith, and directed by Rosenthal.  The film stars Seth Meyers and John Cho, and also features Jessica Paré, Jim Piddock, and Jessalyn Gilsig, with cameo appearances by Patton Oswalt, Miguel Arteta, and the film's executive producers Chris Weitz and Paul Weitz.

The plot revolves around two inept filmmakers who con their way into the Montreal World Film Festival with a movie that does not exist.

The entire film was shot in only thirteen days, in Los Angeles and in Montreal during and with the cooperation of the actual 2003 Montreal World Film Festival.  Festival organizers gave the filmmakers access to all festival events and locations, and even programmed a screening for the film-within-a-film during which festival-goers screened an assembly cut of the film, and got to "play" the audience in the screening scene as it was being shot.

Cast
Jake Barrymore, played by Seth Meyers
Larry Finkelstein, played by John Cho
Martin Hughes, played by Jim Piddock
Annie Nicole, played by Jessalyn Gilsig
Samantha, played by Jessica Paré
Todd Stone, played by Rylan Wilkie
Felix, played by Patton Oswalt
Manager, played by Raymond O'Connor

Awards
Winner of the 2004 Malibu Film Festival Grand Jury Prize for Best Feature
Winner of the 2004 Malibu Film Festival Andy Dick Film Scholarship Award
Official Selection of the 2004 Sedona Film Festival
Official Selection of the 2004 U.S. Comedy Arts Festival

References

External links 
 

2004 films
2004 comedy films
2004 directorial debut films
Films about filmmaking
Films about films
Films directed by David M. Rosenthal
Films set in Montreal
Films set in a movie theatre
Films shot in Los Angeles
Films shot in Montreal
2000s English-language films